The Pavelló de la República Library joined what is now the University of Barcelona's Learning and Research Resources Centre (CRAI) in 1996. It has since grown to become one of the world's leading archival libraries on subjects such as the Second Spanish Republic, the Spanish Civil War, exile, Francoist Spain and Spain's transition to democracy. In addition, the library has important materials on the Soviet Bloc and on the international political history of the twentieth history, particularly World War II.

Context 

In 1937, during the Spanish Civil War, the government of the Spanish Republic participated in the Exposition Internationale des Arts et Techniques dans la vie moderne, better known as the Paris International Exhibition of 1937. The outbreak of the war in 1936 had a clear impact on the Spanish exhibition, and drew significant international attention to it. The Spanish pavilion included Pablo Picasso's Guernica, the now-famous depiction of the horrors of war, as well as Alexander Calder's sculpture Mercury Fountain and Joan Miró's painting Catalan peasant in revolt. The exhibition lasted from 25 May until 25 November 1937. The Pavilion was opened but not until July 12, and was located at Avenida del Trocadero near the pavilions of Germany and the Soviet Union.

The project architect was the philosopher Jose Gaos, curator of the flag, the painter Josep Renau and writer Max Aub who organized the contents of the exhibition pavilion and commissioned the construction of the building to Josep Maria Sert and Luis Lacasa.

Audiovisual production was by Luis Buñuel, appointed coordinator of the Propaganda the Information Service at the Embassy in Paris.

The building 
The building of the Pavilion of the Republic, was conceived by its architect Josep Lluis Sert and Luis Lacasa as an empty container, almost three floors and walls. He left the floor open courtyard that communicated with, covered with a tarp, was the role of audience.

On the first floor, devoted to propaganda and information on the situation of the country at war, it was accessed by a stairway and the second aimed at the arts and popular sections, where the large mural by Joan Miró , the Catalan peasant (now disappeared), it was accessed by a ramp, although there was a vertical access to the interior of the structure.

It was built with a limitation of time and materials, many prefabricated panels and plywood, or synthetic, and adapting the plan to build an irregular terrain, slope and with the obligation to respect the trees in allocated land. It had an area of 1,400 square meters.

It took a sober building that followed the lines of rational architecture despite its ephemeral nature. So basically acquired a cultural and propaganda to let the world know the situation unfolding in Spain, precisely define the objectives of government and emphasized the struggle of the Spanish people.

Inside (front and acting as a gigantic panel exhibitor), they exhibited posters, photographs, photomontages, proclamations, information panels, as well as art and craft, sent directly from Spanish central and regional governments and various unions. Much of the exhibits sought to proclaim to the public the situation was before and after the Spanish Republic, and the war situation.

One of its main attractions was the famous Guernica by Pablo Picasso, located in one wall of the central courtyard where the Mercury Fountain, made by Alexander Calder.

The building now 

With the Olympic Games of 1992, the City Council commended the architects Antonio Ubach, Juan Miguel Hernandez and Miguel Espinet Leon carrying a replica of the Pavilion of the Republic that had been presented at the International Exhibition of Paris of 1937 and was destroyed in the end.

Today, this landmark building, given since 1994, the City Council at the University of Barcelona, is occupied by CRAI Library Hall of the Republic, which has one of the most important collection in the world on Second Republic Civil War, Francoism, Transition and exile in Spain, especially in Catalonia and the International Centre for Historical Studies, founded by Jaume Vicens Vives.

A reproduction of Picasso's famous Guernica can be seen, as was its original location, on a wall of the open courtyard of the pavilion.

Equipment 
Area: 1.109 m2
Restricted bookcases: 5.294 metres lineals
Reading points: 42 (Reading room: 30 / Basement: 12)
Self-service photocopier: 1
Searching PC's: 3
VHS/DVD player: 1

Specific services 

Access conditions and fund's search
Reproduction and document's for borrowing
Building use
Pavelló de la República video
Library's catalogue's news
Visits to the Pavelló e la República
Building plan
Training
Pavelló de la República's fund diffusion
Library's annual report

References

External links 
 CRAI of the Universitat de Barcelona

Library and Pavelló de la República archive's collections 
General description of the Library and the archive's collection
Archive's inventories of collections

Monographic compilations (links to catalan pages) 
Exile
Spanish Civil War (1936-1939)
Spanish Second Republic (1931-1936 term)
80th anniversary of the Second Republic's proclamation
Commemoration of the republican diaspora's 70th anniversary
Tragic Week
Francesc Ferrer i Guàrdia and the Escola Moderna
March 8th, International Women's Day
Air raids during the Spanish Civil War
30th anniversary of the spanish Constitution's referendum (december 6th, 2008)
Joan Comorera i Soler (1895-1958)
Francoist Spain (1939-1975)
Spanish Transition to democracy
Lluís Companys 1882-1940

Digital collections 
Posters of the Pavelló de la República in the MDC
Paper money of the Pavelló de la República in the MDC
Stamps of the Pavelló de la República in the MDC
Pennats of the Pavelló de la República in the MDC
Pegaso's worker memory of the Pavelló de la República in the MDC
Stickers of the Pavelló de la República in the MDC

University of Barcelona
Libraries in Barcelona
History of Catalonia